Rafael Carbonell Carrion (born November 25, 1943 in Oriente, Ciudad de la Habana) is a retired boxer from Cuba, who represented his native country in three consecutive Summer Olympics, starting in 1964.

Carbonell won the gold medal in the men's light-flyweight (– 48 kg) division at the 1971 Pan American Games, where the weight division was included for the first time.

1964 Olympic record
Below are the results of Rafael Carbonell, a Cuban flyweight boxer who competed at the 1964 Tokyo Olympics:

 Round of 32: lost to John McCafferty (Ireland) by decision, 0-5

References
 Profile

1949 births
Living people
Flyweight boxers
Olympic boxers of Cuba
Boxers at the 1964 Summer Olympics
Boxers at the 1968 Summer Olympics
Boxers at the 1972 Summer Olympics
Cuban male boxers
Boxers at the 1971 Pan American Games
Pan American Games gold medalists for Cuba
Pan American Games medalists in boxing
Medalists at the 1971 Pan American Games
20th-century Cuban people